The Adventures of Tom Bombadil is a 1962 collection of poetry by J. R. R. Tolkien. The book contains 16 poems, two of which feature Tom Bombadil, a character encountered by Frodo Baggins in The Lord of the Rings. The rest of the poems are an assortment of bestiary verse and fairy tale rhyme. Three of the poems appear in The Lord of the Rings as well. The book is part of Tolkien's Middle-earth legendarium.

The volume includes The Sea-Bell, subtitled Frodos Dreme, which W. H. Auden considered Tolkien's best poem. It is a piece of metrical and rhythmical complexity that recounts a journey to a strange land beyond the sea. Drawing on medieval 'dream vision' poetry and Irish immram poems, the piece is markedly melancholic and the final note is one of alienation and disillusion.

The book was originally illustrated by Pauline Baynes and later by Roger Garland. The book, like the first edition of The Fellowship of the Ring, is presented as if it is an actual translation from the Red Book of Westmarch, and contains some background information on the world of Middle-earth that is not found elsewhere: e.g. the name of the tower at Dol Amroth and the names of the Seven Rivers of Gondor. There is some fictional background information about those poems, linking them to Hobbit folklore and literature and to their supposed writers, in some cases Sam Gamgee.

Publication history 

The Adventures of Tom Bombadil was first published as a stand-alone book in 1962. Some editions, such as the Unwin Paperbacks edition (1975) and Poems and Stories, erroneously state that it was first published in 1961. Tolkien's letters confirm that 1962 is the correct year. 
Beginning with The Tolkien Reader in 1966, it was included in anthologies of Tolkien's shorter works. This trend continued after his death with Poems and Stories (1980) and Tales from the Perilous Realm (1997).
In 2014 Christina Scull and Wayne G. Hammond edited a new stand-alone edition, which includes for each poem detailed commentary, original versions and their sources.

Only one of the poems, "Bombadil Goes Boating", was written specially for the book.

Seven of the works in the book are included on the 1967 album of Tolkien's songs and poems, Poems and Songs of Middle Earth. Six are read by Tolkien; the seventh, "Errantry", is set to music by Donald Swann.

Contents 

The poems are all supposedly works that Hobbits enjoyed; all are in English. Several are attributed in a mock-scholarly preface to Hobbit authors or traditions. Three are also among the many poems in The Lord of the Rings.

Reception 

A 1963 Kirkus Reviews described the book's verses as "roll[ing] along in strange meters and weird words". It called the poems "difficult fun to read aloud", but suggested that the Stone Troll and Bombadil himself, though "memorable acquaintances", might be enjoyed more by adults than by children.

Richard C. West wrote that the book was the idea of Tolkien's aunt, Jane Neave, who wanted something about Tom Bombadil, resembling one of Beatrix Potter's Little Books; but that his publishers wanted a larger volume. Accordingly he assembled what he had, on the theme of poems that Hobbits might enjoy, grouping them as the editors Scull and Hammond (in the 2015 edition) say "like with like as far as possible", complete with "mock-scholarly preface".

See also 

 Barrow-wight
 Goldberry
 Old Forest
 Old Man Willow

References

Further reading 

 "Tolkien's Lore: The Songs of Middle-earth" by Diane Marchesani, Mythlore, Vol. 7 : No. 1, Article 1. (1980)
 "Niggle's Leaves: The Red Book of Westmarch and Related Minor Poetry of J.R.R. Tolkien" by Steven M. Deyo, Mythlore, Vol. 12 : No. 3 , Article 8. (1986)

External links 

 The Adventures of Tom Bombadil

Middle-earth books
Middle-earth poetry
1962 poetry books
Poetry by J. R. R. Tolkien
English poetry collections
Allen & Unwin books